Walter Durant Berry (September 3, 1870 – July 9, 1953) was an American football coach.  He was the first head football coach at the University of Cincinnati, serving from 1894 to 1895 and compiling a record of 6–6.  Berry later worked as a doctor in New England. In 1903, he married Helen Warren Upham.

Berry had previously been a head football coach at Centre College in Danville, Kentucky from 1981 to 1893, compiling a record of 13 wins and 1 loss. He died in 1953.

Head coaching record

References

1953 deaths
1870 births
People from Warren, Massachusetts
Sportspeople from Worcester County, Massachusetts
Coaches of American football from Massachusetts
Centre Colonels football coaches
Cincinnati Bearcats football coaches